Phosphorylethanolamine or phosphoethanolamine is an ethanolamine derivative that is used to construct two different categories of phospholipids. One category termed a glycerophospholipid and the other a sphingomyelin, or more specifically within the sphingomyelin class, a sphingophospholipid. Phosphorylethanolamine is a polyprotic acid with two pKa values at 5.61 and 10.39.

Phosphorylethanolamine has been falsely promoted as a cancer treatment.

Effectiveness
As a potential drug, phosphorylethanolamine has undergone human clinical trials. These were halted when no evidence of benefit was found.

Edzard Ernst has called Phosphorylethanolamine "the most peculiar case of Brazilian quackery".

Legality
There has been ongoing controversy and litigation in Brazil with regard to its use as a cancer treatment without approval by the National Health Surveillance Agency. For years, Gilberto Chierice, a Chemistry Professor at the São Carlos campus of the University of São Paulo, used resources from a campus laboratory to unofficially manufacture, distribute, and promote the drug to cancer patients without it having gone through clinical testing. In September 2015, university administrators began preventing the Professor from continuing with this practice. In October 2015, several courts in Brazil ruled in favor of plaintiffs who wanted the right to try the compound. However, a state court overturned the lower courts' decision a month later. Jailson Bittencourt de Andrade, secretary for Brazil's science and technology ministry, said the ministry plans to fund further research on the compound, but that it will be years before a determination can be made about phosphorylethanolamine's safety and efficacy in humans.

On April 14, 2016, a law was passed in Brazil allowing the use of synthetic phosphorylethanolamine for cancer treatment, despite opposition from the Brazilian Medical Association, the Brazilian Society of Clinical Oncology, and the regulatory agency Anvisa.  However, shortly after, the country's Supreme Court suspended the law.

See also
 Phosphocholine
 Phosphoserine

References

Additional images

Amines
Organophosphates
Health fraud